The 1877–78 season was the seventh season of competitive football in England.

Overview
Wanderers became the first club to win the FA Cup three times in a row after beating Royal Engineers 3–1 in this season's final. It was the fifth time they had won the competition overall. They never won it again.

International match
A disastrous day for England saw them trounced by Scotland seven goals to two.

National team

Honours

Notes = Number in parentheses is the times that club has won that honour. * indicates new record for competition

References

External links